Echidgnathia vitrifasciata is a moth of the family Sesiidae. It is known from Somalia and Zimbabwe.

References

Sesiidae
Insects of Somalia
Lepidoptera of Zimbabwe
Moths of Sub-Saharan Africa